The Psychogenetic System is a collection of theories about how our romantic relationship styles are influenced by our observations in early childhood of our own parents' relationship processes with each other. It also includes the procedures for discovering and rewriting these scripts, to evolve people's perceptions and behaviors in their present romantic relationships.

Description
Teachworth's Psychogenetic System theories, which comprise a unique system of relationship counseling, were first developed in 1991 by Anne Teachworth, a Certified Gestalt Therapist, the Founder and Director of the Gestalt Institute of New Orleans since 1976. These theories and associated counseling techniques facilitate psychotherapeutic and/or practical resolutions to a romantic couple's relationship problems.  The first step is to discover each partner's early childhood memories of their own parents' relationship behaviors. Next is realization about the personality traits inherited genetically from each parent. Hence the term "psycho" and "genetic" combined.

One of the tools Anne Teachworth developed to survey her clients' childhood relationship programming is called "The Selection Test".  It is a single page with divided sections to primarily list the qualities of each parent as they were with each other in that client's early childhood, and their relationship patterns.  She allowed only ten minutes for each client to spontaneously fill this out in private with no input from their mate, in order to better mine their subconscious memories.

Teachworth first wrote about her "Psychogenetics" theory about relationship counseling in "Three Couples Transformed" which was published as a chapter in the book A Living Legacy of Fritz and Laura Perls: Contemporary Case Studies edited by Bud Feder and Ruth Ronall (1997).  Anne’s own relationship counseling method (and her Selection Test) is explained in depth in her own book on the subject, Why We Pick The Mates We Do, first published in 1997; now in its Seventh edition, revised in 2007.

A Psychogenetics System therapeutic session has its own style, but is built upon elements of Transactional Analysis, Gestalt Therapy, Redecision Therapy, and Neurolinguistic Programming - all of which Anne had a strong training background in.  Additionally, she trained therapists for many years, having co-instructed at times with Richard Bandler, Laura Perls, Joseph Zinker, Dan Blum, Violet Oaklander, Anne Ancelin Schutzenberger, Stella Resnick, Phyllis Jenkins, Leonard Ravich and others well known in the world psychotherapy community.

Since Anne Teachworth's death in February 2012, her legacy utilizing the Psychogenetics System in relationship counseling continues through other proponents and The Gestalt Institute of New Orleans by her son Jeff Teachworth, also a Certified Psychogenetics Coach and a Certified Gestalt Therapist (see Gestalt-Institute.com.)

Teachworth's theories suggest that as naive children we were imprinted at a semi-conscious level.  Each of us stores a script of each of our two parents' patterns of perceiving and reacting to each other. Under stress, in the almost forgotten old child-memory part of our mind, that "script" becomes the most powerful "road-map" of how to act in a relationship, EVEN IF it is breaking it apart.  Under stress, when the logical functions get frustrated, these old patterns of relationship interaction seem to be the only option for survival. Sometimes beneficial, sometimes faulty, these behaviors occur spontaneously. With this trance like phenomenon occurring on behalf of each partner at times of relationship stress, the results can be quite chaotic and painful.

Psychogenetics suggests that for many individuals, later adult mate choosing can be highly influenced by their primal compulsion to find a relationship partner at any expense, even if unconsciously falling into having to roleplay one of the two spousal roles assimilated in their early childhood. These roles are termed your "Inner Mate Model" for the mate you pick; and your "Inner Adult Model" representing the role you play.

Attraction is largely an unconscious process. Managing a relationship is largely not. As young adults we might experience a "magical firework" moment and become powerfully attracted on an unconscious level to someone who closely matches our pre-programmed "Inner Mate Model" - regardless of whether they are a properly productive mate for us. Once drawn through unconsciously driven attraction to a partner whom we have cast into one of our two parents' relationship roles, we can often become stuck into automatically reliving their old problems, escalating disagreements into arguments and worse.

Note that many couples manage to have satisfactory relationships most of the time, sometimes because there were mostly positive personality factors in their parents' relationships for the roleplaying to copy from. It is when there were substantial negative factors that a relationship can have considerable turbulence; and those are the relationships that show up in the counseling office.

Original to Psychogenetics is the observation reported by multiple clients of Teachworth's in her book, how from one marriage to another, the same adult can find their new partner playing the role they played in their previous marriage and realize they are now stuck in the other. One example: A person who was generally the "Topdog" in one relationship sometimes finds themselves more of the "Underdog" in their next relationship. The psychogenetic practitioner strives to assist the clients' evolution through these experiences so they emerge from the childhood relationship trance and able to form fulfilling authentic relationships.

Psychogenetics offers much insight into changing the commonly observed pattern of the same man or woman in multiple marriages always choosing "the same type of partner." Psychogenetics modifies this to say:  Our unconscious is unfairly programmed to replay either one of two spousal roles we naively learned in early childhood years, regardless of whether these roles function well or poorly.  As adults our unconscious is strongly influenced to utilize these TWO reference points to pick marriage partners, but this can be reprogrammed so you can be your better, mature self and find relationship happiness.

Genetic aspect

Also original to Psychogenetics is the idea not only are "mommy's and daddy's" relationship style and habits imprinted in our unconscious; it's also possible and observable to find elements of the spousal habits of ancestral family generations imprinted on an individual's unconscious as well, due to a kind of transitive property.

References

 Psychogenetics in Redecision Therapy by Phyllis Jenkins and Anne Teachworth, Transactional Analysis Journal, April 1, 2020.

Further reading
 Anne Teachworth. (1997) Why We Pick The Mates We Do. Gestalt Institute Press. 
 Bud Feder and Ruth Ronall. (1997) A Living Legacy of Fritz and Laura Perls: Contemporary Case Studies. Bud Feder Publishing. 

Psychotherapeutical theories
Behaviorism